The propositive mood (abbreviated ) expresses proposals or suggestions as a grammatical mood. An example in Korean:
 gage-e ganda. – "Goes to the shop." (declarative)
 gage-e ga. – "Go to the shop." (imperative)
 →  gage-e gaja. – "Let's go to the shop." (propositive)
It is similar to the imperative mood, which expresses commands, in that it is directed to the audience.

Languages featuring a propositive mood, as distinct from an imperative, include Korean and Japanese.

Grammatical moods